The Knitting Guild Association is the largest knitting association in the United States. The Knitting Guild Association (TKGA) is a 501c3 non-profit organization dedicated to providing education and resources to knitters to advance their mastery of the craft of knitting.  TKGA supports serious knitters in their efforts to perpetuate traditional techniques and keep the artisan aspects and high quality standards of the craft alive.  It has over 5,000 members in the United States and abroad, and is dedicated to promoting knitting and knitting education. It was founded in 1984.

TKGA publishes Cast On magazine quarterly. According to the TKGA, Cast On is "the Educational Journal for Knitters" and is filled with valuable lessons and patterns for all levels of knitting. Members can take TKGA courses and also have access to technical articles and free patterns in a members-only area of the TKGA website.

TKGA Certification programs are the gold standard in knitting. These programs are not classes, but research programs where you study techniques, history, and design. Depending on the certification program, you will either knit swatches and projects that demonstrate your expertise, or complete exercises, as well as submit written work that demonstrates your understanding. Volunteers for the Master Hand Knitter Certification review your work and provide detailed feedback to enable you to improve.  For the remaining certification courses, you work one-on-one with an instructor to master the course materials and earn your certification. The certification programs include:

Master Hand Knitting Certification:  Members can enroll in the Master Hand Knitting Program, an extensive three-level program. Each level includes over 18 to 20 swatches to be knit, questions to answer, patterns to write, book and magazine reviews, and papers to research and write. The culminating tasks are the design and knitting of a hat and a sweater, of which one has to be in the Fair Isle style and the other Aran. As of August, 2021, there are 371 Master Knitters worldwide.

Professional Knitter Certification: This course is designed for those who want to take their work to the next level for their personal satisfaction or as a step to fulfilling professional goals as sample/test knitters or finishers.  Unlike the Master Hand Knitting Program, the Professional Knitter Certification does not require that the candidate design garments, write patterns, or research and write reports. The focus of this certification is the actual knitted work. The swatches and projects will demonstrate the candidate’s ability to interpret instructions and patterns as well as identify potential pattern errors. Each module does include questions but they will require no research, just observation.  Work for each module must be submitted within one year of the module’s purchase. If the deadline is missed, the course must be repurchased. The next module must be ordered within 6 month of completing the previous module. An important part of this program is time management.

Certification for Knitwear Designers: This course prepares new designers for a career in knitwear design.  It provides a well-rounded foundation of inspiration, technical skills, proper techniques, and business management to enable designers to professionally design truly unique garments, décor, and accessories. This comprehensive course is designed for aspiring knitwear designers within the hand-knit industry who wish to design professionally for publications and to self-publish. Graduates of the MHK program who intend to design professionally will find this course as a logical next step. 

Certification for Knitting Judges: Knitting competitions are great settings for knitters to gather and share their craft. Along with  encouraging creativity, they promote high standards. They impart a sense of pride in presenting quality work and they are fun for both participants and observers. This course is intended to prepare you to judge knitting competitions. The Knitting Judges Certification Course is TKGA’s original certification course and now includes information for internet judging and competitions that are new to the fiber community.

Certification for Technical Editors:  All designers, knitting magazine editors, yarn companies, and writers of knitting books need Technical Editors. They depend on their tech editors to help them produce error-free patterns and articles that knitters can enjoy knitting and reading. In this course, the goal is to help knitters learn the skills needed to become a knowledgeable and astute technical editor for knitting. Master Knitters have already demonstrated a mastery of advanced knitting skills, and technical editing is one way of applying those skills. Certification will mean that knitters have acquired these necessary skills and can market themselves as a Technical Editor.

Certification for Knitting Instructors:  The goal of this course is to prepare knitters to instruct knitting. Certification will mean that you have acquired the knowledge and skills to teach knitting and you can market yourself as a Certified Knitting Instructor.

Further Educational Courses
The Knitting Guild Association also offers Hand Knitting Correspondence Courses which are conducted via email, a Marketing Course for those working in the knitting industry, a Pattern Writing course, and over 20 mini courses for knitting-related single topics. They host the Next Level Knitting Conference which is an annual virtual conference each spring, and in-person knitting retreats in the fall.  30 August 2021</ref>

The Knitting Guild Association is led by a board of directors consisting of 7 Certified Master Knitters. Arenda Holladay, President of the board and Executive Director, also serves as editor of Cast On Magazine.

References

External links
Official site
TKGA Ravelry Group
Board of Directors

Knitting organizations